The American China Policy Association (ACPA) was an anti-communist organization that supported the government of Republic of China, now commonly referred to as Taiwan, under Chiang Kai-shek.

Origins

On July 17, 1946, J. B. Powell, correspondent, and Helen Loomis, missionary teacher, founded the American China Policy Association (ACPA).  Alfred Kohlberg, a leader in the China Lobby joined as chairman shortly thereafter to promote American interests by promoting the Republic of China under Chiang Kai-shek and the Kuomintang as a counter to Soviet and Chinese Communist support.  (Another source says that Kohlberg established ACPA.)

Activities

In 1947, co-founder J. B. Powell died, succeeded by Clare Booth Luce (wife of Henry R. Luce) as president for one year, then by newspaper publisher William Loeb III.

In 1949, when the Chinese Communist Party seized full control of mainland China and established the People's Republic of China, the ACPA accused the United States Department of State of "losing China."  ACPA supported its allegations with copious literature:  letters, pamphlets, brochures, press releases, and book reviews.  Kohlberg's name went on most of those publications.

ACPA obtained two US Army intelligence reports, which it reproduced via "photolithography" and made available to the press; these documents showed numerous errors and omissions by the State Department.

Directly and through ACPA, Kohlberg criticized US President Harry S. Truman and US Secretary of State George C. Marshall.

During the Korean War, ACPA advocacy "effectively changed" America's orientation with regard to Communist China.

Members

ACPA's board of directors included:
 Alfred Kohlberg (also member of AJLAC, Plain Talk)
 Isaac Don Levine  (also member of AJLAC, Plain Talk)
 Clare Booth Luce
 William Loeb III
 Freda Utley
 Irene Corbally Kuhn
 Max Eastman
 Walter H. Judd
 Geraldine Fitch
 William R. Johnson
 Margaret Proctor Smith
 David Prescott Barrows
 William Henry Chamberlin
 George Creel
 Roscoe Pound

Another person associated with ACPA was Edna Lonigan.

See also

 Alfred Kohlberg
 Plain Talk
 Anti-communism

References

Organizations established in 1946
Political advocacy groups in the United States
Conservative organizations in the United States
1946 establishments in the United States
1950 disestablishments in the United States
United States political action committees
Anti-communist organizations in the United States